River Oaks Academy is a private school at 10600 Richmond Avenue in the Westchase district of Houston, Texas, United States. The school covers grades Kindergarten through 12.

History
The school opened in 1988.

In the 1990s, after voters rejected a Houston Independent School District $390 million bond package, superintendent Rod Paige contracted with River Oaks Academy, the Varnett School, and Wonderland School to house 250 students who could not be placed in HISD schools. The schools were paid $3,565 per student. This was 10% lower than the district's own per pupil cost.

See also

References

External links
 River Oaks Academy

Private K-12 schools in Houston
Educational institutions established in 1988
1988 establishments in Texas